Kaiserjäger is a 1956 Austrian film directed by Willi Forst.

Plot summary

Cast 
Adrian Hoven as Oberleutnant Pacher
Erika Remberg as Antonia, ihre Tochter
Judith Holzmeister as Gräfin Valerie Hardberg
Rudolf Forster as Graf Leopold Hardberg, General a.D.
Attila Hörbiger as Oberst Weigant
Gunther Philipp as Leutnant der Reserve Otto Schatz
Senta Wengraf as Helga von Metzler
Oskar Sima as Oberjäger Kriegler

Soundtrack

External links 

1956 films
1956 romantic comedy films
Austrian romantic comedy films
1950s German-language films
Films set in the 1900s
Films set in the Alps
Films directed by Willi Forst
Films scored by Hans Lang